Katy Nina Karrenbauer (born 31 December 1962) is a German actress, dubbing actress, singer, and author.
She is known for her role as Christine Walter in the drama series Hinter Gittern – Der Frauenknast. In 2015 she received a special award from the German Film Academy for her role in Rosa von Praunheim's film Tough Love.

Filmography 
 1997: Das erste Semester
 1999: Late Show
 2000: Criminal Sorrow Waltz
 2000: Musik hat ihn kaputt gemacht
 2001: Westend
 2002: Wie die Karnickel
 2005: Max und Moritz Reloaded
 2006: 7 Zwerge – Der Wald ist nicht genug
 2007: Was am Ende zählt
 2008: Wachgeküsst in Stuttgart
 2011: Gegengerade – Niemand siegt am Millerntor
 2012: 
 2012: Cloud Atlas
 2015: Tough Love
 2015: Kartoffelsalat – Nicht fragen!
 2017: Goblin 2

Television films 
 2001: Love Letters – Liebe per Nachnahme
 2001: Todeslust
 2002: Vanessa Kramer und der rote Skorpion
 2002: Crazy Race
 2002: Pest – Die Rückkehr
 2004: Crazy Race 2 – Warum die Mauer wirklich fiel
 2004: 
 2006: Die ProSieben Märchenstunde: Rapunzel oder Mord ist ihr Hobby
 2006: Crazy Race 3 – Sie knacken jedes Schloss
 2007: African Race – Die verrückte Jagd nach dem Marakunda
 2007: Was am Ende zählt
 2008: ProSieben Funny Movie: Spiel mir das Lied und du bist tot!
 2008: Putzfrau Undercover
 2010: C.I.S. – Chaoten im Sondereinsatz
 2013: Lotta & die frohe Zukunft
 2013: Plastic – Schönheit hat ihren Preis

Series 
 1994: Notaufnahme (Casualty) (13 episodes)
 1995: Alphateam – Die Lebensretter im OP
 1995: SK Kölsch
 1995,1997, 2008: Verbotene Liebe (13 episodes)
 1995, 2002: Balko
 1996: SK-Babies
 1996: Das Amt
 1997: Nikola
 1997, 1999: Die Wache
 1997–2007: Hinter Gittern – Der Frauenknast
 1998: Gute Zeiten, schlechte Zeiten
 1999: Anke
 2004: Doppelter Einsatz: Kidnapping
 2004: Schillerstraße
 2005: Alarm für Cobra 11 – Die Autobahnpolizei: Unter Feuer
 2004: Bernds Hexe
 2007: Notruf Hafenkante: Spiel des Lebens
 2007, 2009: In aller Freundschaft (2 episodes)
 2008: Plötzlich Papa – Einspruch abgelehnt!
 2010: Anna und die Liebe
 2011: Der letzte Bulle: Camping für Anfänger
 2011: Cindy aus Marzahn und die jungen Wilden
 2011: Glee (Season 2, german voice of Shannon Beiste)
 2011: Löwenzahn
 2012: X-Diaries
 2013: Stuttgart Homicide: Verschlusssache
 2014: Alles was zählt (episodes 1929–1972)
 2015: Im Knast
 2016: Die Spezialisten – Im Namen der Opfer
 2017: Bettys Diagnose

Reality-Shows
 2007: Das große Promi-Pilgern
 2008: Länder – Menschen – Abenteuer
 2010: Big Brother Germany (Celebrity-Host)
 2011: Ich bin ein Star – Holt mich hier raus!
 2011: Das perfekte Promi-Dinner – Dschungel Spezial
 2013: Promi-Shopping-Queen
 2013: Promi Frauentausch

TV-Shows 
 2000: Wer wird Millionär? (Celebrity-Special)
 2000: Die Harald Schmidt Show
 2002, 2003: 3 nach 9
 2002: Zimmer frei
 2002, 2008: DAS!
 2003: Wok-WM
 2006: Freitag Nacht News
 2006: TV total
 2007: Entern oder Kentern
 2009: NDR Talkshow
 2009: Anne Will
 2011, 2015: Markus Lanz
 2011: Inas Nacht
 2013: Cindy aus Marzahn und die jungen Wilden
 2015: Gefragt – Gejagt
 2016: Primetime-talk

References

External links 

 
 

1961 births
Living people
20th-century German actresses
German film actresses
German television actresses
German women writers
German television personalities
Ich bin ein Star – Holt mich hier raus! participants